Rautavaara is a municipality of Finland. It is located in the Northern Savonia region. The municipality is unilingually Finnish.

Tiilikkajärvi National Park is located both in Rautavaara and its neighboring municipality Sotkamo.

History

The municipality of Rautavaara was founded on 12 September 1874 and the parish in 1894.

Villages
Alakeyritty, Ala-Luosta, Etelä-Keyritty, Halmejärvi, Hiirenjärvi, Kangaslahti, Lehtovaara, Lievisenmäki, Palojärvi, Pirttipuro, Pohjois-Keyritty, Puumala, Rannankylä, Rautavaara, Sierajärvi, Siikajärvi, Tiilikka, Ylä-Luosta.

References

External links

Municipality of Rautavaara – Official website 

 
Populated places established in 1874
1874 establishments in Finland